Sir Haydock Evans Morres, 2nd Baronet (1743 – 18 December 1776) was an Anglo-Irish politician. 

Morres was the son of Sir William Morres, 1st Baronet and Margaret Haydock. In 1766 he served a term as Mayor of Kilkenny. Morres was the Member of Parliament for Kilkenny City in the Irish House of Commons between 1768 and his death in 1776.

On 11 October 1774 he succeeded to his father's baronetcy. He had married Frances Jane Gorges Gore on 23 July 1772, but died without issue. Morres' title was inherited by his younger half-brother.

References

1743 births
1776 deaths
18th-century Anglo-Irish people
Baronets in the Baronetage of Ireland
Irish MPs 1769–1776
Irish MPs 1776–1783
Mayors of Kilkenny
Members of the Parliament of Ireland (pre-1801) for County Kilkenny constituencies